Pai Soe (born on 22 March 1987) is a Burmese footballer. He currently plays for Phuket in Thai Division 1 League. He used to play for his home town club Yadanabon in Myanmar National League. He was called up to Myanmar national football team for 2010 AFF Suzuki Cup and 2014 FIFA World Cup qualifiers.

International goals

References

External links 
 

1987 births
Living people
Sportspeople from Mandalay
Burmese footballers
Myanmar international footballers
Association football midfielders
Expatriate footballers in Thailand
Southeast Asian Games silver medalists for Myanmar
Southeast Asian Games medalists in football
Competitors at the 2007 Southeast Asian Games